Klodiana Shala (born 22 August 1979 in Tirana) is an Albanian track and field athlete who competes in the 200 metres and 400 metres sprints. Her personal bests are 23.27 and 52.86 seconds, respectively.

She was the bearer of the Flag of Albania in the opening ceremony of the 2004 Summer Olympics. Since November 2002, she has held a scholarship from the Olympic Solidarity program. She is a four-time Olympic participant having represented Albania at the Olympics in 2000, 2004, 2008 and 2012.

She was the 400 metres bronze medalist at the 2005 Mediterranean Games.

On 19 February 2020 the International Olympic Committee announced that the sample taken from Shala at the 2012 Olympic Games contained the banned doping substance of stanozolol.

Competition record

References

External links 

 
 
 
 

Living people
1979 births
Albanian sportspeople in doping cases
Doping cases in athletics
Sportspeople from Tirana
Albanian female sprinters
Olympic athletes of Albania
Athletes (track and field) at the 2000 Summer Olympics
Athletes (track and field) at the 2004 Summer Olympics
Athletes (track and field) at the 2008 Summer Olympics
Athletes (track and field) at the 2012 Summer Olympics
Mediterranean Games bronze medalists for Albania
Athletes (track and field) at the 2005 Mediterranean Games
World Athletics Championships athletes for Albania
Shala (tribe)
Mediterranean Games medalists in athletics
Olympic female sprinters